Dimitrios Triantafyllakos (3 April 1890 – 22 May 1966) was a Greek sprinter. He competed in the men's 100 metres at the 1912 Summer Olympics.

References

1890 births
1966 deaths
Athletes (track and field) at the 1912 Summer Olympics
Greek male sprinters
Olympic athletes of Greece
Place of birth missing
Sportspeople from Sparta, Peloponnese
20th-century Greek people